Smoke Signal is a populated place in Navajo County, Arizona,  United States.

References

Populated places in Navajo County, Arizona